The 3rd Canadian Division is a formation of the Canadian Army responsible for the command and mobilization of all army units in the provinces of Manitoba, Saskatchewan, Alberta and British Columbia, as well as all units extending westwards from the city of Thunder Bay.

It was first created as a formation of the Canadian Corps during the First World War. It was stood down following the war and was later reactivated as the 3rd Canadian Infantry Division during the Second World War. The second iteration served with distinction from 1941 to 1945, taking part in the D-Day landings of 6 June 1944. A duplicate of the 3rd Canadian Division was formed in 1945 to serve on occupation duty in Germany and was disbanded the following year.

History

First World War

The 3rd Canadian Division was formed in France in December 1915 under the command of Major-General Malcolm Mercer. Its members served in France and Flanders until Armistice Day. While with the 3rd Division at Ypres, Mercer became the highest-ranking Canadian officer killed in action during the First World War. On the same day, Brigadier V. A. Williams, commanding the 8th Infantry Brigade, became the highest-ranking Canadian officer captured in the First World War, also at the Battle of Mount Sorrel. Mercer was replaced by Louis Lipsett, who commanded the division until September 1918, shortly before he too was killed in action on 14 October 1918, while commander of British 4th Division. Major-General Frederick Loomis closed out World War I as the commander.

Battles and engagements on the Western Front

1916:
Battle of Mount Sorrel – 2–13 June
Battle of Flers-Courcelette – 15–22 September
Battle of Morval – 25 September
Battle of Thiepval – 26–28 September
Battle of Le Transloy – 1–18 October
Battle of the Ancre Heights – 1–11 October

1917:
Battle of Vimy Ridge – 9–14 April
Attack on La Coulotte – 23 April
Third Battle of the Scarpe – 3–4 May
Affairs South of the Souchez River – 3–25 June
Capture of Avion – 26–29 June
Battle of Hill 70 – 15–25 August
Second Battle of Passchendaele 26 October – 10 November

1918: 
Battle of Amiens – 8–11 August
Actions round Damery – 15–17 August
Battle of the Scarpe – 26–30 August (including the capture of Monchy-le-Preux)
Battle of the Canal du Nord – 27 September – 1 October (including the capture of Bourlon Wood)
Battle of Cambrai – 8–9 October (including the Capture of Cambrai)
Battle of Valenciennes – 1–2 November
Pursuit to Mons – 11 November

Second World War 

The formation of the 3rd Canadian Infantry Division was authorized during the Second World War on 17 May 1940. There was then a considerable delay until the brigade and divisional headquarters were formed on 5 September, and the first divisional commander was appointed on 26 October.

While the division's components were forming, The Cameron Highlanders of Ottawa was detached and transferred to Iceland as part of Z Force. The battalion spent the winter of 1940–41 there, then moved to the United Kingdom. The division's 8th and 9th Canadian Infantry Brigades began embarking as early as 1 July 1941 and arrived in the United Kingdom at the end of that month. The 7th Canadian Infantry Brigade embarked in August and arrived at the beginning of September.

After its arrival, the division spent three uneventful years in garrison and training duties prior to the assault landing on Juno Beach on D-Day, 6 June 1944, as part of the British Second Army, later joining the newly formed First Canadian Army.

Battle honours include Caen, Falaise, clearing the Channel ports, the Breskens pocket, and the final offensives of 1945. During the Battle of the Scheldt, the 3rd Canadian Infantry Division had the nickname of "Water Rats" bestowed upon them by Field Marshal Sir Bernard Montgomery, commanding 21st Army Group, in recognition of the poor conditions of terrain through which they fought, first in the Normandy landings, and then in the flooded Breskens Pocket.

Juno Beach, D Day 

It lay between Sword and Gold beaches which were the responsibility of British Army forces.

The 3rd Canadian Infantry Division, with the 2nd Canadian Armoured Brigade under command, landed in two brigade groups, the 7th Canadian Infantry Brigade and the 8th Canadian Infantry Brigade. Each brigade had three infantry battalions and an armoured regiment in support, two artillery field regiments, combat engineer companies and specialist units of the British 79th Armoured Division. The 10th Armoured Regiment (The Fort Garry Horse) tanks supported the 7th Brigade landing on the left and the 6th Armoured Regiment (1st Hussars) tanks supported the landing on the right. The division had been assigned extra artillery and anti-tank units doubling its artillery component.

The 9th Canadian Infantry Brigade was kept in reserve and landed later that day and advanced through the lead brigades. The 27th Armoured Regiment (The Sherbrooke Fusiliers Regiment) provided tank support.

The initial assault was carried out by:
 North Shore Regiment on the left at St. Aubin (Nan Red beach)
 Queen's Own Rifles in the centre at Bernières (Nan White beach)
 Regina Rifles at Courseulles (Nan Green beach)
 Royal Winnipeg Rifles on the western edge of Courseulles (Mike Red and Mike Green beaches)

Canadian air, land and sea forces suffered approximately 950 casualties on D-Day, the majority being soldiers of the 3rd Canadian Division. By noon, the entire division was ashore and leading elements had pushed several kilometres inland to seize bridges over the Seulles. By 6:00 pm, they had captured the town of Saint-Aubin-sur-Mer. A 1st Hussars armoured troop reached its objective along with men of The Queen's Own Rifles of Canada before nightfall, when both units moved 15 km inland and crossed the Caen-Bayeux highway. However, this troop was forced to pull back because they had passed the supporting infantry. By the end of D-Day, the division had penetrated farther into France than any other Allied force, though counter-attacks by elements of two German armoured divisions prevented further major gains for four weeks.

None of the assault divisions, including 3rd Canadian Division, had managed to secure their D-Day objectives, which lay inland, although the Canadians came closer than any other Allied formation. Indeed, The Queen's Own Rifles of the 8th Brigade were the only Allied battalion to capture their D-Day objective.

By the end of the next day, the Canadian forces had linked up with the British forces that had landed at Sword Beach.

Time line Juno Beach
6 June 1944
05:35 German shore batteries open fire; Allied naval forces, now massed along entire Normandy coast, begin bombardment.
06:30 Assault on beaches starts. 3rd Canadian Division landing on Juno made more difficult by strong current. Delay allows Germans to mount strong defence. Objective: advance inland and join troops from British beaches.
07:00 German radio broadcasts first report of landing.
08:30 48 Commando lands at St Aubin, Juno Beach and heads east. Beach clearance difficult due to high tides and rough seas.
09:00 General Eisenhower issues communiqué announcing start of invasion.
09:35 Canadian 8th Brigade liberates Bernières.
11:12 After fierce fire fight, 7th Brigade secures Juno exit at Courseulles. But congestion as Canadian 9th Brigade arrives.
11:20 Canadians capture Tailleville, Banville and St Croix.
12:00 As Winston Churchill reports landings to House of Commons, Further landings on Juno. Langrune captured by Juno troops.
13:35 German 352nd Division wrongly advises HQ that Allied assault repulsed. Message not corrected until 18.00.
14:15 All Canadian 3rd Division now ashore on Juno. Rapid advances start: troops link with those from Gold.
Canadian Scottish link with 50th Division at Creully.
Attack by 21st Panzers reach coast between Sword and Juno at Luc-sur-Mer.
22:00 Rommel returns to HQ from Germany. Montgomery sails for France.

Juno Beach: 21,400 troops landed, with fewer than 1,000 casualties. Aim of capturing Carpiquet airfield not achieved. No link yet with Sword forces.

Fighting in Normandy
The 3rd Canadian Infantry Division served extensively in the Battle of Normandy as a component firstly of I British Corps and later under the command of II Canadian Corps. On D-Day+1, units of the division became the first among the Allies to secure their D-Day objectives. The villages of Authie and Carpiquet both saw heavy fighting between the Canadians and German defenders of the 12th SS Panzer Division. Over the course of five days, the 12th SS launched a series of counter-attacks in an attempt to crush the Canadian bridgehead and throw them back into the sea. The attacks cost the 12th a third of their armoured strength and they were forced to retire in the face of stubborn resistance, Allied naval gunfire and aerial superiority. On 4 July 1944, the 3rd Canadian Division, along with the British 3rd and 59th Infantry Divisions and supported by elements of the 79th Armoured Division launched Operation Windsor, capturing the Carpiquet Airfield and the surrounding areas from the 12th SS after several hours of confused and hard fighting. On 8 July, the 3rd Canadian Division participated in Operation Charnwood, the British Second Army's final advance on the northern parts of Caen. Once again the Canadians excelled and captured all their objectives after suffering, once again, heavy casualties.

On 18 July, Operation Atlantic was launched, the Canadian advance that would coincide with Operation Goodwood, happening further east by British forces in the area south of Caen. The 2nd and 3rd Canadian divisions, supported by integral armour support, advanced towards Caen, one of the objectives being the village of Colombelles and the surrounding hills. This village and the surrounding area was defended by the battle-proven 21st Panzer Division. After several hours of confused fighting on the 18th and the 19th, the Germans were forced back from the outskirts of the town and pushed back over the river Orne. The 3rd Canadian Division continued the advance on the 20th and the lead units came under heavy machine-gun and small arms fire from a chateau close to Colombelles. The Queen's Own Rifles of Canada, with support from the 17th Duke of York's Royal Canadian Hussars, pushed forward once again despite heavy casualties and captured the heavily fortified village of Gibberville. The rest of the 3rd Division captured Colombelles through the course of the day. The Canadians were then faced with the formidable German defensive positions on the Verrières Ridge, where the SS troops had created excellent field fortifications, deployed hundreds of field artillery pieces, including Nebelwerfers, and dug numerous trenches and foxholes for defence. The 2nd Canadian division's 4th and 6th brigades assaulted the ridge, but suffered heavy losses and were forced to fall back. The attack went in during heavy rain, which turned the ground to mud and bogged down the Canadian armoured support and kept the Hawker Typhoon fighter-bomber support from the Royal Air Force from showing up. After the failed attack, troops from both the 2nd and 12th SS Panzer Division counter-attacked; it was only with support from the 3rd Canadian Division's 8th Brigade that they managed to beat the Germans back.

Meanwhile, the British 3rd Infantry Division faced considerable resistance and advanced only with great cost of life. Tiger tanks from the schwere Panzerabteilung 503 ("503rd Heavy Armour Battalion") caused ferocious losses among the British armour support. The 7th Armoured Division, 11th Armoured Division and Guards Armoured Division faced opposition from the 1st and 12th SS Panzer divisions and suffered heavy losses.

The offensive continued for two more days before the Allied offensive ground to a halt in face of stiffening German resistance. The German Panzer divisions in the area had been bled completely dry, losing a staggering number of tanks and men, which could not be easily replaced. Two days later, on 25 July, the United States First Army launched Operation Cobra, since there were no German panzer divisions to stop them as nearly all of the available panzer units had been sent to stop the British/Canadian advance. The 3rd Canadian Division and the other units involved in the offensive were allowed to catch their breath and they dug in, expecting a German counter-attack which never came.

On 5 September, 3rd Canadian overran the Fortress of Mimoyecques, revealing the infrastructure for the unknown V-3 cannon destroyed by the Tallboy bombs in July. Between 17 and 22 September 1944, 3rd Canadian were intimately involved in the liberation of Boulogne-sur-Mer, during which a French civilian guided the Canadians to a "secret passage" leading into the walled old town and by-passing the German defenders. By 1 October 1944, the Division had also liberated Calais.

Commanders
Major-General Ernest William Sansom: 1940–1941
Major-General Charles Basil Price: 1941–1942
Major-General Rod Keller: 1942–1944
Major-General Daniel Spry: 1944–1945
Major-General Ralph Holley Keefler: 1945

Duplicate division (Canadian Army Occupation Force) 1945–1946
In 1945, the 3rd Canadian Division, Canadian Army Occupation Force (CAOF) was created, based on the organization of the 3rd Infantry Division. The component units of the new division were named after the units of the existing 3rd Infantry Division. The formation was formed on the organizational structure of a standard infantry division and supplied units as part of Canada's commitment to postwar European reconstruction. The occupation force served in Germany until relieved by the 52nd (Lowland) Infantry Division of the British Army on 15 May 1946. Authorization for units to disband came under General Order 162/46 and 201/46, and headquarters was disbanded by General Order 283/46, effective 20 June 1946.

Recent history (1990-present) 
In the early 1990s Land Force Western Area (LFWA) was established as one of four area commands of the Canadian Army. LFWA was responsible for all Regular and Reserve Army formations in Manitoba, Saskatchewan, Alberta and British Columbia. The line formations of LFWA included 1 Canadian Mechanized Brigade Group, 38 Canadian Brigade Group, 39 Canadian Brigade Group, and 41 Canadian Brigade Group.

In addition to the brigades, LFWA was also composed of 1 Area Support Group and its bases, 4th Canadian Ranger Patrol Group of the Canadian Rangers, and the Western Area Training Centre. LFWA contributed extensively to domestic operations at home, and on missions abroad in locales such as the Balkans and Afghanistan for over two decades.

On 6 June 2014, on the 70th anniversary of the 3rd Canadian Infantry Division's D-Day landing in Normandy, LFWA became 3rd Canadian Division. On the same day, 3 Cdn Div was permanently bestowed the French Grey designation patch.

Structure

Historical

World War I 
7th Infantry Brigade:
The Royal Canadian Regiment. December 1915 – 11 November 1918;
Princess Patricia's Canadian Light Infantry. 24 December 1915 – 11 November 1918;
42nd (Royal Highlanders) Battalion Canadian Infantry. December 1915 – 11 November 1918;
49th (Edmonton) Battalion Canadian Infantry. December 1915 – 11 November 1918.

8th Infantry Brigade:
1st Battalion, Canadian Mounted Rifles, CEF. December 1915 – 11 November 1918;
2nd Battalion, Canadian Mounted Rifles, CEF. December 1915 – 11 November 1918;
4th Battalion, Canadian Mounted Rifles, CEF. December 1915 – 11 November 1918;
5th Battalion, Canadian Mounted Rifles, CEF. December 1915 – 11 November 1918.

9th Infantry Brigade: (Joined the Division in January 1916)
43rd (Cameron Highlanders) Battalion Canadian Infantry. January 1916 – 11 November 1918;
52nd (North Ontario) Battalion Canadian Infantry. January 1916 – 11 November 1918;
58th (Central Ontario) Battalion Canadian Infantry. January 1916 – 11 November 1918;
60th (Victoria Rifles) Battalion Canadian Infantry. January 1916 – 30 April 1917. (Disbanded)
116th (Ontario County Infantry) Battalion Canadian Infantry. April 1917 – 11 November 1918.

Pioneers:
3rd Canadian Pioneer Battalion. 8 January 1916 – May 1917 (Disbanded);
123rd Canadian Pioneer Battalion. March 1917 – June 1918. To the 3rd Canadian Engineer Brigade.

World War II 
 7th Canadian Infantry Brigade
1st Battalion, The Royal Winnipeg Rifles
1st Battalion, The Regina Rifle Regiment
1st Battalion, The Canadian Scottish Regiment (Princess Mary's)
7th Infantry Brigade Ground Defence Platoon (Lorne Scots)
 8th Canadian Infantry Brigade
1st Battalion, The Queen's Own Rifles of Canada
1st Battalion, Le Régiment de la Chaudière
1st Battalion, The North Shore (New Brunswick) Regiment
8th Infantry Brigade Ground Defence Platoon (Lorne Scots)
 9th Canadian Infantry Brigade
1st Battalion, The Highland Light Infantry of Canada
1st Battalion, The Stormont, Dundas and Glengarry Highlanders
1st Battalion, The North Nova Scotia Highlanders
9th Infantry Brigade Ground Defence Platoon (Lorne Scots)
 Divisional Troops
7th Reconnaissance Regiment (17th Duke of York's Royal Canadian Hussars)
1st Battalion, The Cameron Highlanders of Ottawa (Machine Gun)
3rd Canadian Divisional Signals, R.C. Sigs
No. 3 Defence and Employment Platoon (Lorne Scots)
No. 4 Canadian Provost Company, Canadian Provost Corps
No. 14, No. 22, No. 23 Field Ambulance, Royal Canadian Army Medical Corps
 Divisional Royal Canadian Artillery
12th Field Artillery Regiment, RCA
13th Field Artillery Regiment, RCA
14th Field Artillery Regiment, RCA
3rd Anti-Tank Regiment, RCA
4th Light Anti-Aircraft Regiment, RCA
Divisional Royal Canadian Engineers
6th Field Company, RCE
16th Field Company, RCE
18th Field Company, RCE
3rd Canadian Field Park Company, RCE
3rd Canadian Divisional Bridge Platoon, RCE

Current 
The division is headquartered at CFB Edmonton and covers Western Canada.

3rd Canadian Division, at CFB Edmonton

 1 Canadian Mechanized Brigade Group, at CFB Edmonton, CFB Shilo
38 Canadian Brigade Group, in Winnipeg (covering Saskatchewan, Manitoba, and Northwestern Ontario)
39 Canadian Brigade Group, in Vancouver (covering British Columbia)
41 Canadian Brigade Group, in Calgary (covering Alberta)
3rd Canadian Division Support Group, at CFB Edmonton
1 Military Police Regiment, at CFB Edmonton
6 Intelligence Company (Reserve), in Edmonton
1st Canadian Ranger Patrol Group, at CFNA HQ Yellowknife (patrolling Northwest Territories, Yukon, and Nunavut)
4th Canadian Ranger Patrol Group, at CFB Esquimalt (patrolling British Columbia, Alberta, Saskatchewan, and Manitoba)
3rd Canadian Division Training Centre, at CFB Wainwright, CFB Shilo, CFB Edmonton

Insignia 
In August 1916, individual battalions of the Canadian Corps were ordered to wear a distinguishing patch to better provide command and control in battle. Battalions were represented by a series of coloured geometric patches that corresponded to their seniority within the brigades of the overseas divisions of the corps. The location was quickly moved from the collar to the sleeve. The 3rd Division was originally ordered to wear white patches, followed ten days later by an order changing the colour to black and the location. In May 1917, the commander of the 3rd Division published a routine order stating that, because the black patches were too difficult to see, French grey was to be worn instead.

The patch was revived in 1941. The 3rd Canadian Division, CAOF, wore a French-grey patch with a  French-grey bar added horizontally underneath the division patch to distinguish it from the war service 3rd Division.

In 2014, the revived 3rd Canadian Division adopted a French-grey formation patch. After much debate, Pantone Grey 535C was adopted. The Pantone colour is actually "Blue Range" and was arrived at by comparison to artifacts in various historical exhibits. The colour was approved by the Directorate of History and Heritage, a sub-group of the Department of National Defence.

See also
 List of military divisions
 List of Canadian divisions in World War II

Notes

References

Further reading
 
Marc Milner. Stopping the Panzers: The Untold Story of D-Day. Lawrence, Kansas: University Press of Kansas, 2014.

External links
 
Memorial of Coudehard-Montormel – 3rd ID in the Falaise pocket – website of the Coudehard-Montormel Memorial
 History of the 3rd Canadian infantry division at memorial-montormel.org

Infantry divisions of Canada
Divisions of Canada in World War I
Canadian World War II divisions
Military units and formations established in 1915
Military units and formations established in 2014
1915 establishments in Canada